Kamal Krishna Das  is an Indian politician. He was elected from Birbhum, West Bengal to the Lok Sabha, lower house of the Parliament of India as a member of the Indian National Congress.

References

External links
Official biographical sketch in Parliament of India website

1921 births
Possibly living people
People from West Bengal
India MPs 1952–1957
India MPs 1957–1962
Lok Sabha members from West Bengal